Józef Piotr Trenkwald (August 14, 1897 in Vienna, Austria-Hungary – November 19, 1956 in London, Great Britain) was a Polish horse rider  who competed in the 1928 Summer Olympics.

He won the bronze medal in the team three-day event with his horse Lwi Pazur after finishing 25th in the individual three-day event.

External links
profile 
dataOlympics profile

1897 births
1956 deaths
Polish male equestrians
Equestrians at the 1928 Summer Olympics
Olympic equestrians of Poland
Olympic bronze medalists for Poland
Olympic medalists in equestrian
Sportspeople from Vienna
Austro-Hungarian military personnel of World War I
Polish people of the Polish–Soviet War
Burials at Brompton Cemetery
Medalists at the 1928 Summer Olympics